A market hall is a covered space for selling different goods, mostly groceries.

Market Hall may also refer to:

Market house, historically used as a marketplace to buy and/or sell provisions or livestock

Bulgaria
Central Sofia Market Hall, enclosed market in Sofia, Bulgaria

Hungary
Great Market Hall, Budapest, market hall in Budapest Hungary which opened in 1897

Netherlands
 Market Hall (Rotterdam), residential and office building with a market hall underneath

United Kingdom
Amersham Market Hall, listed building in Amersham, Buckinghamshire, England
Bolton Market Hall, listed building in Bolton, England converted into a modern shopping centre
Carlisle Market Hall, covered Victorian market in Carlisle, Cumbria, England
Leadenhall Market, covered market and tourist attraction in London city
Market Hall, Monmouth, early Victorian building in Monmouth, Monmouthshire, Wales
Market Hall Museum, Warwick, historic museum in Warwick, Warwickshire, England
Old Market Hall, market house in Shrewsbury, England
Smithfield Market Hall, derelict market in Manchester, England

United States
City Market (Charleston, South Carolina), historic market complex in Charleston, South Carolina, United States
Dallas Market Center, building at the Dallas Market Center in Dallas, Texas, United States

Architectural disambiguation pages